SM Shamim Uz Zaman SBP, BSP, ndc, psc is a Bangladesh Army Major General. He is currently serving as the Bangladeshi Ambassador to Libya. Prior to join here, he served as Military Secretary to the President of Bangladesh.

Early life 
Zaman was born on 2 January 1965 in Khulna, Bangladesh. After completion his HSC he joined army at 1983. He was commissioned from Bangladesh Military Academy with 11 BMA Long Course in the Corps of Infantry on 21 December 1984. He completed his bachelor's degree from Chittagong University, Masters in Defence Studies from National University, Bangladesh and Masters in Military Science from Madras University, India. He attended Advanced Security Cooperation Course in Hawaii, USA, Green Arrow Missile Course in Pakistan as well as Amy Staff Course in Wellington, India.

Career 
Zaman was also a Platoon Commander in Bangladesh Military Academy. He was Director General of Directorate General of Defence Purchase. He served as General Officer Commanding (GOC) and Sylhet Area Commander until he joined as Military Secretary to President Md Abdul Hamid in 2019. He has commanded Bangladesh Military Command to Kuwait for more than four years.

References 

Living people
Bangladeshi military personnel
Bangladesh Army generals
Bangladeshi generals
1965 births
Ambassadors of Bangladesh to Libya